Atranes are a class of tricyclic molecules with three five-membered rings. It is a heterocyclic structure similar to the propellanes. It has a transannular dative bond from a nitrogen at one bridgehead to a Lewis acidic atom such as silicon or boron at the other bridgehead.

Nomenclature 
 
Various atranes are named depending on the central element, e.g. "silatrane" (E = silicon); "boratrane" (E = boron); "phosphatrane" (E = phosphorus), etc. It is also proposed that when Y = nitrogen, the prefix "aza" be inserted before element + "atrane" (azasilatrane, for example) because atranes wherein E = silicon and Y = oxygen have been referred to as just "silatranes".

Structure and properties 

Silatranes exhibit unusual properties as well as biological activity in which the coordination of nitrogen to silane plays an important role. Some derivatives such as phenylsilatrane are highly toxic.

The transannular coordinate bond in atranes can be stretched (quasiatranes) and even broken (proatranes,) by controlling their stereoelectronic properties. The strength of the transannular interaction depends on the electronegativity of the participating atoms and the size of the rings.

Proazaphosphatrane is a very strong non-ionic base and is utilized in various types of organic synthesis as an efficient catalyst.

See also
Stannatrane
Hypervalent molecule

References

Heterocyclic compounds